Bisheh Bozan (also Romanized as Bīsheh Bozān) is a village in Shahi Rural District, Sardasht District, Dezful County, Khuzestan Province, Iran. At the 2006 census, its population was 348, in 67 families.

References 

Populated places in Dezful County